Peterborough Software was a Payroll and Human Resources software and services company started in Peterborough, England in 1963. It is notable for being a pioneer of computerised Payroll Services and Software in the United Kingdom, as cited by UK magazine Personnel Today. The Company was acquired by Northgate Information Solutions in 2004.

History

Early years
The company was formed in Peterborough, England in 1963, by Ian K. Evans-Gordon a programmer at Perkins Engines, Peterborough using spare capacity on his firm’s mainframe computer.

1972 - Launches Unilist, software to analyse the data held on its payroll programme. Company now has 18 staff.

1975 - Unipersonnel launched. Systems updated to enable on-line data entry instead of batch processing.

1980s
PC-Based products (running on MS-DOS), branded PS2000 and using Revelation Software (a Pick based product) released in 1987.

1990s
An April 1996 article in The Independent newspaper in the UK reported "The group is the market leader with 73 of the top 100 companies and 20 per cent of the UK working population paid through its systems. Sales have grown from pounds 7m to pounds 30m since 1986".

In 1997 the Company became part of the newly formed Rebus Group, formed from (inter alia) Peterborough Software and Septre Computer Services.

In 1999 Rebus Software was named as the leading (UK) systems supplier for HR and Payroll in a survey conducted as part of the annual Computers in Personnel event 

In 1999 Rebus was taken private by Warburg Pincus and General Atlantic at a cost of £172m.

2000s
The Company was bought by  Northgate in early 2004 for £153million.

See also
MultiValue The original NoSQL database predating Oracle, SQL Server

References

Software companies of England
Defunct software companies of the United Kingdom
Business software companies
Human resource management consulting firms
Payroll
Companies based in Peterborough
Defunct companies of England
British companies established in 1963
Consulting firms established in 1963
Software companies disestablished in 2004
1963 establishments in England
2004 disestablishments in England
Warburg Pincus companies